Fame and Partners is a vertically integrated online fashion retailer, with offices in Los Angeles and Sydney, focused on customizable, made-to-order fashion.

History 
The company was founded in 2013 by Nyree Corby. As of 2014, its headquarters was in Sydney.

References 

Clothing retailers of Australia
Online clothing retailers of the United States
Australian companies established in 2013